Streptomyces pini is a bacterium species from the genus of Streptomyces which has been isolated from the phylloplane of a pine (Pinus sylvestris) in Coimbatore in India.

See also 
 List of Streptomyces species

References

External links
Type strain of Streptomyces pini at BacDive -  the Bacterial Diversity Metadatabase

 

pini
Bacteria described in 2016